Vidiškės is a village in Ignalina district municipality, in Utena County, southern Lithuania. According to the 2011 census, the town has a population of 931 people.

The village has a church (built in 1906) and Vidiškės manor (from XVII C.) with its 6 buildings. Between Varnio lake and Vidiškės manor there is a large park. The village has a gymnasium, a library and a post office (ZIP code: 30030).

Famous citizens
Algimantas Šalna (b. 1959), Lithuanian biathlete, World and Olympic champion.

References

Villages in Utena County
Sventsyansky Uyezd
Wilno Voivodeship (1926–1939)
Ignalina District Municipality